Starbuck Crater is a small snow-filled crater at the base of the west slope of the Mount Bursey massif in Marie Byrd Land.

History
Mapped by United States Geological Survey (USGS) from ground surveys and U.S. Navy air photos, 1959–66. Named by Advisory Committee on Antarctic Names (US-ACAN) for James E. Starbuck of the Bartol Research Foundation, who studied cosmic rays at the South Pole Station in 1970.

References

Mountains of Marie Byrd Land
Volcanoes of Marie Byrd Land
Volcanic craters
Flood Range